Porgoli may refer to:
 Porgoli-ye Olya
 Porgoli-ye Sofla